The Florida Film Critics Circle Award for Best Actor is an award given by the Florida Film Critics Circle to honor the finest male acting achievements in filmmaking.

Winners
* = winner of the Academy Award for Best Actor in a Leading Role

1990s

2000s

2010s

2020s

Multiple Wins
 3 Wins
 Daniel Day-Lewis (2002, 2007, 2012)
 2 Wins
 Adam Driver (2019, 2021)
 Geoffrey Rush (1996, 2000)

Florida Film Critics Circle Awards
Film awards for lead actor